Curtis Haywood (born November 8, 1975 in Oklahoma City, Oklahoma) is an American basketball player. For the 2007/08 season, he played with the Venezuelan team Trotamundos de Carabobo.

He played collegiately for Bacone College (1995–97) and Oklahoma City University (1997–1999).

He signed with the Toronto Raptors on October 3, 2000, but was released a few weeks later without playing in regular season for them.

He played professionally for Yakima Sun Kings (CBA, 1999–00), FC Gaia Basquetebol (Portugal, 2000), BC Hamburg Tigers (Germany, 2000), Fayetteville Patriots (NBDL, 2001), St. Louis Skyhawks (USBL, 2002), InterCollege Etha Engomis (Cyprus, 2002–04), Gary Steelheads and Rockford Lightning (CBA, 2004), Al-Ittihad (Aleppo) (Syria, 2005–06), Arkansas Aeros (ABA, 2006–07) and Al-Ahli (Jeddah) (Saudi Arabia, 2007).

He played with over 20 international teams during his professional basketball career. He won a CBA championship with the Lawton-Fort Sill Cavalry.

References

External links 
 CNN/SI Haywood profile

1975 births
Living people
American expatriate basketball people in Cyprus
American expatriate basketball people in Germany
American expatriate basketball people in Portugal
American expatriate basketball people in Saudi Arabia
American expatriate basketball people in Syria
American expatriate basketball people in Venezuela
ABA All-Star Game players
Bacone College alumni
Bacone Warriors men's basketball players
Basketball players from Oklahoma
Fayetteville Patriots players
Oklahoma City Stars men's basketball players
Sportspeople from Oklahoma City
Trotamundos B.B.C. players
American men's basketball players